El Hijo del crack (meaning "Son of the Star") is a 1953 Argentine football drama film co-directed by Leopoldo Torre Nilsson and Leopoldo Torres Ríos and starring Armando Bo and Oscar Rovito. The film, a tale of a dwindling professional football star and his son was released on December 15, 1953 in Normandie cinema in Buenos Aires.  The cast involved major professional football players of the time as  Mario Boyé, Tucho Méndez and Ángel Labruna and journalists such as Fioravanti. It is the last film in which Leopoldo Torres Ríos and Leopoldo Torre Nilsson (father and son) worked together. The 77 minute film was produced by Sociedad Independiente Filmadora Argentina  (SIFA).

Plot

Mario Lopez (Oscar Rovito) is a child, the son of an aging footballer (Armando Bo) .  On the one hand, while his father is disowned by supporters for being no longer physically able to play it,  he tries to convince himself  that this is a temporary decline and he will return to his former star status. On the other hand, his mother and his maternal grandfather, reject the world of football and the street, arguing that it is a primitive world and inadequate, isolating him. Only his son remains a major fan. Dying from a serious illness, he tries to please his fans once more and regain his legendary status.

Cast
Armando Bo as Héctor 'Balazo' López
Óscar Rovito as Mario López
Miriam Sucre as María del Carmen de López
Francisco Pablo Donadio as Alvarado
Pedro Laxalt 		
Héctor Armendáriz 
Alberto Rinaldi 		
Rolando Dumas 			
Nelson de la Fuente 			
Carlos Benso

Reception

The International Film Guide described the film as a "purely commercial work", unlike many of Torre Nilson's other films such as El Crimen de Oribe (1950) and later films which were more art films with attention to themes,  plot and psychological aspects. Jorge Miguel Couselo in his 1984 book Historia del cine argentino remarked that "despite a poor script, [the film] showed seriousness" and praised the talent and performance by Oscar Rovito playing the son.  Ricardo Oliveri in his 1997 book Cine argentino: crónica de 100 años concurred that Rovito had contributed a good performance and described the film as an "agreeable product". The Institute de Literatura Argentina highlighted the strong presence of the father and son in the film and noted its neorealist elements and charge.

References

External links

 

1953 films
1950s Spanish-language films
Argentine black-and-white films
Films directed by Leopoldo Torre Nilsson
Argentine association football films
1950s sports drama films
1953 drama films
Argentine sports drama films
Films directed by Leopoldo Torres Ríos